The Office of the Assistant Secretary for Health (OASH) is an operating agency of the United States Department of Health and Human Services and the managing personnel body for the United States Public Health Service. The office is under the direction of the Assistant Secretary for Health, who serves as the senior advisor on public health and science issues to the Department Secretary. The Office serves as the focal point for leadership and coordination across the Department in public health and science, provides direction to program offices within OASH, and provides advice and counsel on public health and science issues to the Secretary.

Prior to 2010, the Office was known as the Office of Public Health and Science (OPHS).

Organization 
As of 2018, OASH oversees 12 core public health offices, 10 regional health offices, and 10 presidential and secretarial advisory committees.  The core offices are:

 National Vaccine Program Office
 Office of Adolescent Health
 Office of Disease Prevention and Health Promotion
 Office of HIV/AIDS and Infectious Disease Policy
 Office for Human Research Protections
 Office of Minority Health
 Office of Population Affairs
 Office of Research Integrity
 Office of the Surgeon General
 Public Health Service Commissioned Corps
Office of Women's Health
President's Council on Sports, Fitness, and Nutrition

References

External links
 Official website